Concepción Langa Nuño was born in Seville, Spain. She is a historian specializing in art history, media history and the Spanish Civil War and is a member of the faculty of Geography and History at the University of Seville.

References 

1968 births
Living people
People from Seville
21st-century Spanish historians
Spanish women historians
Spanish translators
Spanish women writers
University of Barcelona alumni
Academic staff of the University of Seville
Historians of Spain
Economic historians
English–Spanish translators